The 1975–76 UEFA Cup was won by Liverpool over Club Brugge on aggregate.

The third club was revoked from the Netherlands and Austria, and it was assigned to the Soviet Union and Sweden.

First round

|}

First leg

Second leg

Both legs were played in West Germany, MSV Duisburg won 10–3 on aggregate.

Ajax won 14–1 on aggregate.

4–4 on aggregate; Real Sociedad won on away goals.

Barcelona won 6–2 on aggregate.

Spartak Moscow won 2–1 on aggregate.

Royal Antwerp won 5–1 on aggregate.

Budapest Honvéd won 3–2 on aggregate.

Carl Zeiss Jena won 4–0 on aggregate.

Red Star Belgrade won 4–2 on aggregate.

Milan won 1–0 on aggregate.

Ipswich Town won 4–1 on aggregate.

Śląsk Wrocław won 5–4 on aggregate.

Hertha BSC won 6–2 on aggregate.

Liverpool won 3–2 on aggregate.

Stal Mielec won 3–1 on aggregate.

Köln won 5–2 on aggregate.

Club Brugge won 6–4 on aggregate.

Öster won 6–1 on aggregate.

Dynamo Dresden won 6–3 on aggregate.

Lazio won 3–1 on aggregate.

Porto won 10–0 on aggregate.

Galatasaray won 3–2 on aggregate.

Roma won 2–1 on aggregate.

Torpedo Moscow won 5–2 on aggregate.

Vasas SC won 4–2 on aggregate.

AEK Athens won 3–1 on aggregate.

Hamburg won 4–2 on aggregate.

Athlone Town won 4–2 on aggregate.

Inter Bratislava won 8–2 on aggregate.

Dundee United won 6–0 on aggregate.

Levski-Spartak Sofia won 7–1 on aggregate.

Sporting CP won 5–2 on aggregate.

Second round

|}

First leg

Lazio refused to play for security reasons, claiming it would be impossible to play due to political demonstrations following the execution in Spain of five ETA and FRAP members on 27 September on terrorism charges. UEFA awarded Barcelona a 3–0 victory, ruling those three goals were not applicable for the away goals rule.

Second leg

4–4 on aggregate; Levski-Spartak Sofia won on away goals.

Milan won 3–0 on aggregate.

1–1 on aggregate; Stal Mielec won on penalties.

Porto won 3–2 on aggregate.

Torpedo Moscow won 7–2 on aggregate.

Ajax won 4–2 on aggregate.

Dynamo Dresden won 3–2 on aggregate.

3–3 on aggregate; Inter Bratislava won on away goals.

Club Brugge won 4–3 on aggregate.

Spartak Moscow won 3–0 on aggregate.

Roma won 2–1 on aggregate.

Liverpool won 9–1 on aggregate.

Hamburg won 5–1 on aggregate.

Śląsk Wrocław won 3–2 on aggregate.

Vasas SC won 4–3 on aggregate.

Before the game, Johan Cruyff was given his Ballon d'Or award for the 1974 season.

Barcelona won 7–0 on aggregate.

Third round

|}

First leg

Second leg

3–3 on aggregate; Levski-Spartak Sofia won on penalties.

Barcelona won 4–1 on aggregate.

Club Brugge won 2–0 on aggregate.

Dynamo Dresden won 4–3 on aggregate.

Hamburg won 3–2 on aggregate.

Stal Mielec won 2–1 on aggregate.

Liverpool won 5–1 on aggregate.

Milan won 4–2 on aggregate.

Quarter–finals

|}

First leg

Second leg

Barcelona won 8–5 on aggregate.

Club Brugge won 3–2 on aggregate.

Liverpool won 2–1 on aggregate.

Hamburg won 2–1 on aggregate.

Semi–finals

|}

First leg

Second leg

Liverpool won 2–1 on aggregate.

Club Brugge won 2–1 on aggregate.

Final

First leg

Second leg

Liverpool won 4–3 on aggregate.

External links
1975–76 All matches UEFA Cup – season at UEFA website
Official Site
Results at RSSSF.com
 All scorers 1975–76 UEFA Cup according to protocols UEFA
1975/76 UEFA Cup - results and line-ups (archive)

UEFA Cup seasons
2